Law's Falls is a tourist spot in Coonoor, The Nilgiris, Tamil Nadu.

See also
 Coonoor
 Nilgiri mountains
 Catherine Falls
 Lamb's Rock
 Sim's Park
 Droog Fort
 Dolphin's Nose
 Katary Falls
 Lady Canning's Seat

References

Tourist attractions in Nilgiris district
Waterfalls of Tamil Nadu
Coonoor